Mathieu Griffi (born 2 March 1983) is a French former professional rugby league footballer who played in the 2000s and 2010s.

Background
Mathieu Griffi was born in Aude, France, and he is of Italian descent.

Playing career
He was named in the France training squad for the 2008 Rugby League World Cup, he was named in the France squad for the 2008 Rugby League World Cup,  and he also represented France in the 2009 Four Nations tournament.

References

1983 births
Catalans Dragons players
France national rugby league team players
French people of Italian descent
French rugby league players
Lézignan Sangliers players
Living people
People from Carcassonne
Rugby league props
Spain national rugby league team players
Sportspeople from Aude
Toulouse Olympique players